Mitromorpha philippinensis is a species of sea snail, a marine gastropod mollusk in the family Mitromorphidae.

Description
The length of the shell varies between 7 mm and 11 mm.

Distribution
This marine species occurs off the Philippines at a depth between 30 m and 35 m.

References

 Mifsud, C., 2001 The genus Mitromorpha Carpenter, 1865 and its subgenera with European species, p. 32 pp
 Chino M. & Stahlschmidt P. (2009) New turrid species of the Mitromorpha-complex (Gastropoda: Conidae: Clathurellinae) from the Philippines and Japan. Visaya 2(4): 63–82

External links
 
 

philippinensis
Gastropods described in 2001